The Confederation of Indian Industry (CII) is a non-governmental trade association and advocacy group headquartered in New Delhi, India, founded in 1895.

CII engages business, political, academic, and other leaders of society to shape global, regional, and industry agendas. It is a membership-based organisation.

CII has been appointed as the B20 India Secretariat by the Government of India to lead the B20 India process during India's G20 Presidency in 2023.

History

The journey of CII began in 1895, when 5 engineering firms - Martin & Company, Burn & Company, John King & Company, Jessop & Company, and Turner Morrison & Company – decided to form the Engineering and Iron Trades Association (EITA). To promote the interests of Indian manufacturers, EITA was renamed as Indian Engineering Association (IEA) in 1912. In 1942, the Engineering Association of India (EAI) was founded to promote the interests of small and medium engineering firms. In 1974, EAI merged with IEA and formed the Association of Indian Engineering Industry (AIEI) which in 1986 became the Confederation of Engineering Industry (CEI). The CEI in 1991, became the present Confederation of Indian Industry (CII).

During the 1980s, Mr. Rajiv Gandhi, then Prime Minister of India played a critical role in galvanising the Association of Indian Engineering Industry (AIEI) into the Confederation of Indian Industry - a national organisation that would represent the interests of Indian industry. He considered AIEI more professional & modern and consulted it on important policy matters.

In 1998, the then Prime Minister, Mr Atal Bihari Vajpayee while addressing CII's National Conference & Annual Session urged to reform the government, industry and the common citizen. This was his first address to any industry association as the Prime Minister. Mr Vajpayee reaffirmed the government's commitment to reforms and underscored the importance of sustainable economic growth.

In 2007, the then Indian Prime Minister, Dr Manmohan Singh at CII Annual Session, invited corporate India to be a partner in making a more humane and just society where he emphasised on Ten-Point Social Charter for inclusive growth.

In 2020, Indian Prime Minister, Narendra Modi gave the plenary speech at CII's 125th Annual Session. He focused on building an Atmanirbhar Bharat (self-reliant India) and bringing India back on the path of rapid development.

Organisation
CII is a body registered under Societies Registration Act, 1860 of India. The highest governing body of CII is the CII National Council, composed of leading industry heads and experts.

Leadership
For 2022–23, Mr Sanjiv Bajaj, Chairman & Managing Director of Bajaj Finserv Limited is the President of CII, Mr R Dinesh, Executive Vice Chairman of TVS Supply Chain Solutions Limited is the President Designate of CII, and Mr Sanjiv Puri, chairman and managing director, ITC is the Vice President of CII. Mr Chandrajit Banerjee is the Director General of CII since May 2008.

T. V. Narendran CEO & Managing Director of Tata Steel Limited was the President, CII for the year 2021–22.
Uday Kotak, Managing Director & CEO of Kotak Mahindra Bank was the President of CII for the year 2020–21.

Membership
CII has direct membership of over 9000 organisations and an indirect membership of over 3,00,000, from around 294 national and regional sectoral associations.

Activities

Policy Advocacy
CII has over 500 ‘Intellectual Groups’ — councils, committees, task forces, and working groups among others — working at the national and regional levels, across industry sectors. These groups give shape to and articulate member concerns to government policymakers, regulators, think tanks etc. They work pro-actively  with the government to formulate policies that would empower businesses.

CII has been a catalyst of change in India's economic policy reforms. CII played a very important role during economic liberalisation in 1991 which knocked down the high walls of protection between Indian industry and the rest of the world.

CII actively engages with central and state governments at various levels on issues facing Indian industry and society and recommends policies conducive to the development of India.

To stimulate foreign investment into India and promote industrial activities, CII partners with Department for Promotion of Industry and Internal Trade (DPIIT). CII is a joint venture partner in Invest India, a National Investment Promotion and Facilitation Agency, established by DPIIT.

Competitiveness
CII has set up dedicated Centers of Excellence to enhance the competitiveness of Indian industry through training, consultancy, and research. These centres provide special services to the industry to enable firms to lower their costs and become more productive and competitive. Currently, there are ten Centers of Excellence set up in the areas of Quality, Green Business, Manufacturing Excellence, Logistics, SMEs, Sustainable Development, Leadership, Food & Agriculture, and Water Institute, and Innovation, Entrepreneurship and Start-ups.

Quality Movement

India started its quality movement journey in the early 1980s. Late Japanese Professor Kaoru Ishikawa visited India in 1986, then heading JUSE (Union of Japanese Scientists and Engineers). During his visit to India, he recommended starting a national drive for quality by setting up an institutional arrangement. CII took the lead in this initiative and has since spearheaded the quality movement in India. In 1988, A Total Quality Management Division (TQMD) was set up on Ishikawa's recommendation. The TQMD evolved into the CII Institute of Quality, which lead a quality movement that aimed to transform Indian businesses by offering them Total Quality Management skills such as Total Productive Maintenance, Lean Management, Six Sigma, Industrial and Legal Metrology, and Conformity Assessment & Standards. CII and the Export-Import Bank of India jointly established the CII-EXIM Bank Award for Business Excellence in 1994. The Award is based on the internationally recognised EFQM Excellence Model. The CII Institute of quality has had a major impact on a large number of firms in India in terms of raising overall awareness regarding quality.

Environment

CII initiated industry engagement in the area of environment and climate change in 1991, when the landmark Rio Summit was held. Since then, it has established three Centres of Excellence that work in the area of climate change, air pollution, environment, sustainability, green building, energy and water management.

Green Building

Going green way addresses ecological challenges and also makes good business sense. Keeping this principle in mind, the CII Sohrabji Godrej Green Business Centre (GBC) was launched in March 2000 during the visit of the then U.S. President Bill Clinton to India. The Centre aims to promote ecologically sustainable business models in green economy. The GBC was inaugurated by Dr. A. P. J. Abdul Kalam, the then President of India on 14 July 2004. The GBC headquarters at Hyderabad is India's first platinum rated green building which has been awarded by the United States Green Building Council (USGBC), under the Leadership in Energy and Environmental Design (LEED) rating system.

Since 2004, the GBC under the aegis of Indian Green Building Council (IGBC) is spearheading the green movement in the country by offering services to various national and international stakeholders in the areas of green projects.

In 2011, the centre launched the GreenCo Rating system which evaluates how green a company is and suggests the way forward on resource conservation and energy & environmental management. In 2015, GreenCo Rating was acknowledged in India's Intended Nationally Determined Contribution (INDC) document, submitted to United Nations Framework Convention on Climate Change (UNFCCC), as a proactive voluntary action of Indian industry towards combating climate change.

So far, 22 green building rating systems have been designed by GBC to address ecological challenges. IGBC Green Building Rating System has adopted over 5,400 green building projects amounting to over 7.5 billion sq. ft.

International Partnership
CII connects Indian Industry with multiple stakeholders across the globe while also highlighting India's position as a stable and dependent partner. CII's international work constitutes working closely with the Indian Government to creating policies conducive to the trade and development procedures in India, identifying best practices, and creating access to foreign markets. Such activities include meeting with the Heads of State and Government, decision-makers, networking with counterpart organisations, multilateral and academic institutions, and other policy-making bodies.

CII's international engagement journey started with the opening of its first overseas office in 1977 in Dammam, Saudi Arabia. This endeavour helped to place the organisation on a high pedestal of relationship with the government, diplomatic missions, and international agencies. AIEI organised the very first international trade mission to Africa in 1975, covering Kenya, Zambia, Egypt, and Libya. In 1976, a Mission went to Iran, Iraq, and Kuwait. These initiatives of AIEI helped explore business opportunities in African and middle-east markets.

From 2013, CII has broadened its focus of work through more Regional and Country Committees like: Africa, ASEAN + ANZ, East Europe, GCC, LAC, Bangladesh, Canada, China, Germany, Italy, Japan, Maldives, Nepal, Pakistan, Russia, South Korea and Sri Lanka.
CII's International work is backed by 9 overseas offices in Australia, China, Egypt, Germany, Indonesia, Singapore, UAE, UK, and the US that helps propagate important information pertaining to markets and joint venture possibilities to both Indian and global companies.

CII has been appointed as the B20 Secretariat by the Government of India to lead the B20 India process during India's G20 Presidency in 2023.

Community development
CII undertakes a series of focused interventions to ensure the inclusive and social development of economically and socially challenged groups through corporate engagement. For bettering the lives of citizens, CII's long-standing work in the social sector was formalised through the establishment of the CII Foundation in 2011. The Foundation provides a meaningful bridge between marginalised communities and donors, especially the corporate sector. The core areas of intervention include CSR and ethical conduct, education, public health, skill development, affirmative action, women empowerment, people with disabilities, climate change, and disaster relief & rehabilitation.

In the year 2000, CII set up the Indian Business Trust for HIV/AIDS to engage the industry in meeting the challenges of the deadly virus. This Trust helped formulate ISO 9002 workplace policy and protocols for industry. More than 2000 companies in India joined this campaign to provide a safe and healthy work environment for their employees.

During the COVID-19 pandemic, CII extended its support to a large number of affected people to mitigate the global crisis. Synergizing the efforts of Indian industry and engaging with the Government of India, CII reached out to various sections of the society, providing immediate relief and strategic long-term rehabilitation support.

To tackle the unexpected and immense challenge posed by the COVID-19 pandemic, CII formed a high-level task force to find possible solutions to issues faced by Indian industry. CII made immediate policy interventions and representations at both the state and central government levels for macroeconomic management, monetary measures, and ease of doing business. It came out with an impact assessment on industry and economy with an exit strategy to sustain continuity.

Initiatives
CII has undertaken various initiatives: India@75, Young Indians, and Indian Women Network.

India@75
India@75 is a CII initiative that envisions how India should be in 2022 – the 75th year of India's independence. The idea of India@75 was conceptualised at the Incredible India@60 celebrations in New York in 2007, where Professor C.K. Prahalad, management professor at the University of Michigan, shared his vision of India@75.

CII adopted his vision of India@75 on 8 May 2008. After consultations, a national vision document - India@75 – The People’s Agenda was released. It was structured around the ten broad themes - Education & Skill Development, Technology & Innovation, Agriculture, Businesses, Infrastructure & Urbanization, Health, Environment, Arts, Sports & Literature, Governance & Public Administration and Moral Leadership.

To turn this vision into reality, CII set up the India@75 Foundation. This initiative of CII has also found resonance with the Government of India, as in the Strategy for New India@75 document released by the NITI Aayog in 2018.

The CII Annual Meeting 2021 was organised on 11–12 August 2021 on the theme- “India@75: Government and Business working together for Aatmanirbhar Bharat.” Shri Narendra Modi, Hon’ble Prime Minister of India, was the Chief Guest and delivered the inaugural address.

Young Indians
CII set up Young Indians (YI) in 2002 to engage youth leaders in nation building. YI is one of the founding members of the G20 Young Entrepreneur's Alliance (G20 YEA) and Commonwealth Alliance of Young Entrepreneurs – Asia Pacific (CAYE-A). Through MASOOM, Gift an Organ and Road Safety projects, the organisation connects youth in development work. It's student wing YUVA engages with students through 130 institutions in India. YI has participated in disaster relief operations and health emergencies such as COVID-19. Young Indians has 3,600 members across its 51 offices, and 29,500 students YUVA members from colleges in India.

Indian Women Network
CII launched Indian Women Network (IWN) in 2013 to develop women workforce and work towards challenges faced by them at the workplace. Through CII's National Committee on Women Empowerment, IWN engages with the government, industry and thought leaders to shape inclusive policy for women workforce. IWN has developed an online Gender Diagnostic Tool for companies to self-assess and identify strengths, gaps and opportunities to improve gender parity and develop their potential. It has also initiated Equal Opportunity Pledge for companies to ensure inclusive work environment for women.

National Foundation for Corporate Governance 
To promote voluntary, transparent and accountable corporate governance practices in India, Ministry of Corporate Affairs set up National Foundation for Corporate Governance (NFCG) as a Trust in the year 2003. It was set up in partnership with Confederation of Indian Industry (CII), Institute of Company Secretaries of India (ICSI) and Institute of Chartered Accountants of India (ICAI). In the year 2010, Institute of Cost Accountants of India (ICAI) and National Stock Exchange (NSE) were included in NFCG as Trustees and in 2013 Indian Institute of Corporate Affairs (IICA) also joined as Trustee. NFCG has been the catalyst in promoting highest standards of Corporate Governance in India and endeavours to make India a leader in Corporate Governance by setting a global benchmark.

References

External links

 

Trade associations based in India
Chambers of commerce in India
Non-profit organisations based in India
Organisations based in Delhi
Organizations established in 1895
1895 establishments in India